Palestinians hold a diverse range of  views on the peace process with Israel, though the goal that unites them is the end of the Israeli occupation of the West Bank. Some Palestinians accept a two-state solution, with the West Bank and the Gaza Strip forming a distinct Palestinian state, whereas other Palestinians insist on a one-state solution (Palestinian or binational) with equal rights for all citizens whether they are Muslims, Christians or Jews. In this scenario, Palestinian refugees may be allowed to resettle the land they were forced to flee in the 1948 Palestinian exodus. However, widespread anti-Semitic sentiments in Palestinian society and Palestinian militancy have hindered the peace process.

Background
Palestinians have held diverse views and perceptions of the peace process. A key starting point for understanding these views is an awareness of the differing objectives sought by advocates of the Palestinian cause.  'New Historian' Israeli academic Ilan Pappe says the cause of the conflict from a Palestinian point of view dates back to 1948 with the creation of Israel (rather than Israel’s views of 1967 being the crucial point and the return of occupied territories being central to peace negotiations), and that the conflict has been a fight to bring home refugees to a Palestinian state. Therefore, this for some was the ultimate aim of the peace process, and for groups such as Hamas still is. However, Jerome Slater says that this ‘maximalist’ view of a destruction of Israel in order to regain Palestinian lands, a view held by Arafat and the PLO initially, has steadily moderated from the late 1960s onwards to a preparedness to negotiate and instead seek a two-state solution.  The Oslo Accords demonstrated the recognition of this acceptance by the then Palestinian leadership of the state of Israel’s right to exist in return for the withdrawal of Israeli forces from the Gaza Strip and West Bank. However, there are recurrent themes prevalent throughout peace process negotiations including a feeling that Israel offers too little and a mistrust of its actions and motives. Yet, the demand for the "Right of Return" (ROR) by descendants of Palestinian refugees to Israel has remained a cornerstone of the Palestinian view and has been repeatedly enunciated by Palestinian president Mahmud Abbas who is leading the Palestinian peace effort.

Yasser Arafat and the PLO

The PLO has complex, often contradictory attitudes to peace with Israel.  Officially, the PLO accepted Israel's right to exist in peace, which was the first of the PLO's obligations under the Oslo Accords. In Yasser Arafat's 9 September 1993 letter to Israeli Prime Minister Yitzhak Rabin, as part of the first Oslo Accord, Arafat stated that "The PLO recognizes the right of the State of Israel to exist in peace and security." These remarks from Arafat was seen as a shift from one of the PLO's previous primary aims—the destruction of Israel.

However, during the 1990s and 2000s the PLO leadership has stated that it considered any peace with Israel was to be temporary until the dream of Israel's destruction could be realized. Arafat often spoke of the peace process in terms of "justice" for the Palestinians; terms historian Efraim Karsh described as "euphemisms rooted in Islamic and Arabic history for the liberation of the whole of Palestine from 'foreign occupiers.'" When describing his views of the peace process among Arab leaders and in the media of the Arab world, Arafat's rhetoric became noticeably more bellicose than it was when among Western leaders and media outside of the Arab world. The period saw a disconnect between what the PLO's second in command Abu Iyad referred to as "the language of peace" and support of Palestinian terrorism.

Since the 1990s, there has been a debate within the PLO as to whether to halt terrorist activities completely or to continue attacking Israel as well as negotiate diplomatically with Israel. In practice, terrorism was never fully banned.  Furthermore, assassination attempts by radical Palestinian factions within the PLO since the early years of the peace process kept Arafat from expressing full, public support of the peace process or condemnation of terrorism without risking further danger to his own life.

In 2000, after Yasser Arafat rejected the offer made to him by Ehud Barak based on a two-state solution and declined to negotiate for an alternative plan, it became clear that Arafat would not make a deal with Israel unless it included the full Palestinian right of return, which would demographically destroy the Jewish character of the State of Israel. For this reason, critics of Arafat claim that he put his desire to destroy the Jewish state above his dream of building an autonomous Palestinian state.

Hamas and the Palestinian Islamic Jihad

The stated goal of Hamas and the Palestinian Islamic Jihad is to conquer Israel and replace it with an Islamist state. Both groups reject the Oslo Accords and other plans for peace with Israel.  Throughout the 1990s and 2000s, the two groups worked together to derail the peace process by attacking Israeli civilians. Hamas undertook a ceasefire with Israel in August 2004.  The Palestinian Islamic Jihad was unhappy with the ceasefire.  In September 2005, Hamas was criticized by Islamic Jihad for calling off rocket attacks on Israel from Gaza.

In 2008, Hamas publicly offered a long-term hudna (truce) with Israel if Israel agreed to return to its 1967 borders and to grant the "right of return" to all Palestinian refugees.  In 2010, Ismail Haniyeh announced that Hamas would accept the outcome of a Palestinian referendum on a peace treaty with Israel even if the results were not in line with their ideology.  This represented a departure from their earlier insistence that they would not be bound by any such result.  In 2012, Mousa Abu Marzook, a high-ranking Hamas official in competition with Haniyeh for Hamas' top leadership post, gave an interview in which he expressed a range of opinions, some of which differed from the organisation's actual stance.  He said that Hamas will not recognize Israel and will not feel bound to understand a peace treaty negotiated by Fatah as a recognition of Israel, calling instead for a hudna (temporary truce).  Abu Marzook echoed Haniyeh's demand that Palestinians should be given the unconditional right to return into what is now Israel proper.

Prominent Palestinians

Rashid Abu Shbak, a senior PA security official declared, "The light which has shone over Gaza and Jericho [when the PA assumed control over those areas] will also reach the Negev and the Galilee [which constitute a large portion of pre-1967 Israel]."

The PA's Voice of Palestine radio station broadcast a Friday prayer sermon by Yusuf Abu Sneineh, official preacher at Jerusalem's Al-Aqsa Mosque, over the radio.  In it, he asserted, "The struggle we are waging is an ideological struggle and the question is: where has the Islamic land of Palestine gone? Where [are] Haifa and Jaffa, Lod and Ramle, Acre, Safed and Tiberias?  Where is Hebron and Jerusalem?"

PA cabinet minister Abdul Aziz Shaheen told the official PA newspaper, Al-Havat Al-Jadida, on January 4, 1998, "The Oslo accord was a preface for the Palestinian Authority and the Palestinian Authority will be a preface for the Palestinian state which, in its turn, will be a preface for the liberation of the entire Palestinian land."

Faisal Husseini, former Palestinian Authority Minister for Jerusalem, compared the Al-Aqsa Intifada following the Oslo peace process to the tactic of coming out of the Trojan Horse used by the Greeks in the myth of the Trojan War.

See also
Palestinian political violence#Palestinian attitudes towards political violence
Israeli views on the peace process

References

External links
"Mideast Peace Process: Palestinian View" online interview with Fawaz Gerges.  washingtonpost.com.  8 February 2005.
"Palestinian Positions toward Israeli Peace Movements and Normalization with Israel" by Aluma Solnik and Yotam Feldner.  Middle East Media Research Institute.  21 August 1998.
"A Pessimist's View of the Peace Process" by Yigal Carmon.  Middle East Forum. 13 February 1997.

Israeli–Palestinian peace process
Point of view